The 2021–22 Rock Cup was a single-leg knockout tournament contested by clubs from Gibraltar, with twelve clubs that participated. The winners, Lincoln Red Imps qualified for the 2022–23 UEFA Champions League, due to finishing first in the 2021–22 Gibraltar National League, so the fourth-placed team, Bruno's Magpies qualified for the 2022–23 UEFA Europa Conference League instead.

Lincoln Red Imps are the defending champions, who also won this edition by defeating Bruno's Magpies in the final, 2–1, after scoring two late goals in the 89th and 90+1st minute to come back from a 1–0 deficit.

Bracket

First round
The draw for the first round of this season's tournament was held on 7 January 2022. Bruno's Magpies received a bye to the quarter-finals by virtue of winning the GFA Challenge Trophy last season.

After the draw, 3 more teams received byes to the next round: Europa Point, Lions Gibraltar and Mons Calpe.

All kick off times are in CET.

Quarter-finals
The draw for the quarter-finals took place on 7 February 2022. Matches took place between 8-10 March.

Semi-finals
The draw for the semi-finals took place on 14 March 2022. Ties took place on 19 and 20 April 2022.

Final
The final was played on 7 May.

Scorers
4 goals

 Adil Azarkan (Lincoln Red Imps)

3 goals

 Antonio Pino (Europa)
 Juanfri (St Joseph's)

2 goals

 Joseph Chipolina (Lincoln Red Imps)
 Kike Gómez (Lincoln Red Imps)
 Boro (St Joseph's)
 Julian Valarino (St Joseph's)

1 goal

 Olatunde Bayode (Bruno's Magpies)
 Edenilson Bergonsi (Bruno's Magpies)
 José Galán (Bruno's Magpies)
 Julian Lopez (Bruno's Magpies)
 Nathan Murr (Bruno's Magpies)
 Pibe (Bruno's Magpies)
 Adam Gracia (College 1975)
 Dylan Borge (Europa)
 Adrián Gallardo (Europa)
 Anthony Hernandez (Europa)
 Juampe (Europa)
 Willy (Europa)
 Javier Añón (Lincoln Red Imps)
 Ethan Britto (Lincoln Red Imps)
 Fernando Carralero (Lincoln Red Imps)
 Mustapha Yahaya (Lincoln Red Imps)
 Alberto Valdivia (Lynx)
 Alberto Lubango (Manchester 62)
 Matt Nezval (Manchester 62)
 Robert Montovio (Mons Calpe)
 Ishmael Antwi (St Joseph's)
 Iván Ruíz (St Joseph's)
 Jamie Serra (St Joseph's)

Own goals
 Javi Anaya (College 1975) vs Lincoln Red Imps

See also
2021–22 Gibraltar National League
2021–22 Gibraltar Intermediate League - Hound Dogs participate in this league.

References

External links
Gibraltar Football Association

Rock Cup
Rock Cup
Rock Cup